The Under Secretary of Commerce for Standards and Technology, or USC(ST), is a high-ranking official in the United States Department of Commerce and the principal advisor to the United States Secretary of Commerce on the technological development. The Under Secretary is dual hatted as the Director of the National Institute of Standards and Technology within the Commerce Department.

The Under Secretary is appointed by the President of the United States with the consent of the United States Senate to serve at the pleasure of the President. The current Under Secretary is  Laurie E. Locascio, who was appointed by President Joe Biden and assumed office on April 19, 2022. Locascio is a biomedical researcher, former National Institute of Standards and Technology (NIST) official, and current Vice President for Research at two University of Maryland locations.

Overview
As the Director of NIST, the Under Secretary is responsible for promoting American innovation and industrial competitiveness by advancing measurement science, standards, and technology in ways that enhance economic security and improve our quality of life.

With the rank of Under Secretary, the USC(ST)/Director is a Level III position within the Executive Schedule. The Under Secretary ranks sixth in the line of succession for the office of Secretary of Commerce.

History
The position of Under Secretary/Director was created by the America COMPETES Reauthorization Act of 2010, which was signed into law by President Barack Obama in 2010.

In the Electronic Commerce Technology Promotion Act, the 106th Congress created a position for Under Secretary of Commerce for Technology, appointing Dr Cheryl L. Shavers to the position.

Reporting officials
NIST officials reporting to the USC(ST)/Director include:
Associate Director for Laboratory Program/Principal Deputy
Associate Director for Innovation and Industry Services
Associate Director for Management Resources

Officeholders

See also
List of directors of the National Institute of Standards and Technology

References

External links